John Walker is a former professional rugby league footballer who played in the 1960s. He played at club level for Castleford (Heritage № 455).

Playing career

County honors
John Walker won a cap for Yorkshire while at Castleford; he played left-, i.e. number 11, in the 13-15 defeat by Cumberland at Belle Vue, Wakefield on Wednesday 25 September 1963.

County League appearances
John Walker played in Castleford's victory in the Yorkshire County League during the 1964–65 season.

BBC2 Floodlit Trophy Final appearances
John Walker played  in Castleford's 7-2 victory over Swinton in the 1966 BBC2 Floodlit Trophy Final during the 1966–67 season at Wheldon Road, Castleford on Tuesday 20 December 1966.

References

External links
Search for "Walker" at rugbyleagueproject.org
John Walker Memory Box Search at archive.castigersheritage.com

Living people
Castleford Tigers players
English rugby league players
Place of birth missing (living people)
Rugby league locks
Year of birth missing (living people)
Yorkshire rugby league team players